Ottavio Scotti (1904–1975) was an Italian art director. Scotti was born in Umago, which was then part of Italy but is today in Croatia. He worked on more than a hundred films during his career, including Orson Welles's Black Magic which was shot at Cinecittà in Rome.

Selected filmography

 Hurricane in the Tropics (1939)
 A Thousand Lire a Month (1939)
 The Castle Ball (1939)
 I, His Father (1939)
 Red Tavern (1940)
 Light in the Darkness (1941)
 Fedora (1942)
 Invisible Chains (1942)
 A Little Wife (1943)
 The Devil's Gondola (1946)
 Bullet for Stefano (1947)
 Fatal Symphony (1947)
 Be Seeing You, Father (1948)
 Chains (1949)
 Black Magic (1949)
 The Flame That Will Not Die (1949)
 The Count of Saint Elmo (1950)
 The Thief of Venice (1950)
 Women and Brigands (1950)
 Nobody's Children (1951)
 The Piano Tuner Has Arrived (1952)
 A Woman Has Killed (1952)
 Black Feathers (1952)
 Woman of the Red Sea (1953)
 Storms (1953)
 The Count of Saint Elmo (1953)
 Genoese Dragnet (1954)
 A Parisian in Rome (1954)
 Orient Express (1954)
 Sunset in Naples (1955)
 Carovana di canzoni (1955)
 The Prince with the Red Mask (1955)
 The White Angel (1955)
 The Wolves (1956)
 Toto and Marcellino (1958)
 È arrivata la parigina (1958)
 Nella città l'inferno (1959)
 Siege of Syracuse (1960)
 Howlers in the Dock (1960)
 Letto a tre piazze  (1960)
 La garçonnière (1960)
 The Mongols (1961)
 My Son, the Hero (1962)
 The Slave (1962)
 The Monk of Monza (1963)
 Castle of Blood (1964)
 Gideon and Samson (1965)
 The Almost Perfect Crime (1966)
 The Oldest Profession (1967)
 Web of the Spider (1971)

References

Bibliography 
 Richards, Jeffrey. Swordsmen of the Screen: From Douglas Fairbanks to Michael York. Routledge, 2014.

External links 
 

1904 births
1975 deaths
Italian art directors
People from Umag